Dam Tang-e Miyan Tangan (also Romanized as Dam Tang-e Mīyān Tangān; also known as Damtang-e Mīyānmakān) is a village in Kuh Mareh Khami Rural District, in the Central District of Basht County, Kohgiluyeh and Boyer-Ahmad Province, Iran. At the 2006 census, its population was 103, in 22 families.

References 

Populated places in Basht County